, also known as , originally referred to an annual ceremony held at the Japanese imperial court on May 5. It was one of the five annual court ceremonies called . Since the Kamakura period (1185–1333), when the samurai class seized power,  has become an event to ward off evil spirits for samurai boys. Japanese armour,  (helmets) and Japanese swords were displayed in houses from the Kamakura period to the Muromachi period (1333–1573). From the Edo period (1603–1867),  were displayed in homes,  (carp streamers) were hung in gardens. From this period, the custom of decorating houses with offerings on  spread to the peasant and  classes, and paper  began to be displayed. Since the Showa era (1926–1989), miniatures of samurai armor have become more popular than samurai dolls.

Until recently,  was known as Boys' Day (also known as Feast of Banners) while  was celebrated on March 3. In 1948, the government decreed this day to be a national holiday to celebrate the happiness of all children and to express gratitude toward mothers. It was renamed  and changed to include both boys and girls.

It is the Japanese equivalent of Double Fifth and was celebrated on the fifth day of the fifth moon in the Lunisolar calendar. After Japan switched to the Gregorian calendar, the date was moved to May 5.

Etymology 
Days of the week also have zodiac animals. Thus,  originally meant 'the first horse day of the fifth month'.

History 

Although it is not known precisely when  began to be celebrated, it was probably during the reign of the Empress Suiko (593628 AD). In Japan,  was assigned to the fifth day of the fifth month after the Nara period.

 was originally a day for women to purify the house by thatching the roof with irises, which were believed to be effective in repelling evil spirits, and for women to rest their bodies, but it was changed to a day for boys in the Kamakura period (1185–1333) when the samurai class took control of the government. Since this period,  (Japanese horseback archery) was held on May 5 as a way to ward off evil spirits.

Samurai used to take their armor, and Japanese swords out of their storage boxes in May before the rainy season to take care of them.

During the Edo period (1603–1867),  celebrations became extravagant, and samurai households began to display  in addition to real armor, and Japanese swords. Ordinary households began to display paper . The custom of bathing in the bathtub with irises on May 5 began in this period.

The custom of decorating  (carp streamers) on Children's Day originated in the Edo period. The colorful  as they are modernly known became popular in the Meiji era (1868–1912).

After Japan switched to the Gregorian calendar, the date was moved to May 5 of the new calendar year. Until 1948, Children's Day was known as Boys' Day (also known as Feast of Banners), celebrating boys and recognizing fathers, as the counterpart to Hinamatsuri, or "Girl's Day" on March 3. In 1948, the name was changed to Children's Day to include both male and female children, as well as recognizing mothers along with fathers and family qualities of unity.

In the Showa era (1926–1989), the popularity shifted from samurai dolls to miniature armor, and since the 21st century, miniature  have become popular, probably due to the size of Japanese houses.

For example, people would take a bath with irises in the bathtub, soak thinly sliced iris roots or leaves in sake and drink it, or put irises in thin washi (Japanese traditional paper) before putting it in their pillows and going to bed.

See also 
 Aging of Japan
 Children's Day
 Double Fifth
 Golden Week

Notes

References
 Nussbaum, Louis Frédéric and Käthe Roth. (2005). Japan Encyclopedia. Cambridge: Harvard University Press. ; OCLC 48943301

External links

 Kids Web Japan
 Video on Children Day in Fukushima, Japan
 Video on Children Day in Coffs Harbour, Australia

Public holidays in Japan
Buddhist festivals in Japan
May observances
Japanese words and phrases